Qingyi River (Chinese: 青衣江) is a major river in western Sichuan. Qingyi means blueish-colored clothes. This name came from the local ancient kingdom Qingyi Qiang Kingdom (est. in 816 B.C.), in which notable people preferred to wear blue clothes. Qingyi River is the longest tributary of Dadu River, and it is also a major river in upper Yangtze River system. The elevation difference between its source and mouth is more than 5000 meters.

Rivers of Sichuan